was the succeeding ruling head over Ichijō family's Tosa Province, throughout the late Sengoku period of Feudal Japan.

He was a Christian and had baptismal name .

References

Daimyo
1543 births
1585 deaths